Tajikistan competed at the 2008 Summer Olympics which was held in Beijing, People's Republic of China from August 8 to August 24, 2008. The country has sent thirteen competitors to the Games, who took part in five sports: boxing, judo, swimming, hammer throw and freestyle wrestling.

On August 11, 2008, Rasul Boqiev won Tajikistan's first Olympic medal, a bronze in men's judo. This was Tajikistan's first Olympic medal ever.

Medalists

Archery

Athletics

Key
 Note – Ranks given for track events are within the athlete's heat only
 Q = Qualified for the next round
 q = Qualified for the next round as a fastest loser or, in field events, by position without achieving the qualifying target
 NR = National record
 N/A = Round not applicable for the event
 Bye = Athlete not required to compete in round

Men

Women

Boxing

Judo

Men

Shooting

Men

Swimming 

Men

Women

Weightlifting

Wrestling

Key
  - Victory by Fall.
  - Decision by Points - the loser with technical points.
  - Decision by Points - the loser without technical points.

Men's freestyle

References

Nations at the 2008 Summer Olympics
2008
Summer Olympics